Takashi Tomura (born 23 August 1958) is a Japanese equestrian. He competed at the 1984 Summer Olympics and the 1992 Summer Olympics.

References

1958 births
Living people
Japanese male equestrians
Olympic equestrians of Japan
Equestrians at the 1984 Summer Olympics
Equestrians at the 1992 Summer Olympics
Place of birth missing (living people)
Asian Games medalists in equestrian
Equestrians at the 1986 Asian Games
Asian Games gold medalists for Japan
Medalists at the 1986 Asian Games